Lykke Li is a Swedish singer and songwriter. Her discography consists of five studio albums, four extended plays (EPs), twenty-four singles (including three as a featured artist), and twenty-two music videos. Eager to pursue a music career, Li began working with producer Björn Yttling of Swedish indie rock band Peter Bjorn and John when she was 19. The sessions resulted in her debut EP Little Bit, which she released on her own label LL Recordings in 2007. The release garnered attention from indie pop and mainstream publications in Sweden, while its title track peaked at number 20 on the Sverigetopplistan singles chart. Li soon released her debut studio album, Youth Novels (2008), which peaked at number three on the Swedish albums chart and spawned three more singles, including her second chart entry "I'm Good, I'm Gone". She then signed with Atlantic Records to distribute her releases worldwide. Youth Novels received widespread critical praise, but sales were poor.

Li appeared on American hip hop group N.A.S.A.'s single "Gifted" in 2009, and penned and recorded the song "Possibility" for the soundtrack of The Twilight Saga: New Moon later that year. Her second studio album Wounded Rhymes (2011) received similar critical success as Youth Novels, while adopting a darker sound. The album peaked at number two in Sweden and was certified gold by the Swedish Recording Industry Association (GLF). It also reached the top 20 on the album charts of Canada, Denmark, Finland, Ireland and Norway. Wounded Rhymes second single, "I Follow Rivers", is Li's best performing single to date; it reached the top five on multiple charts and peaked at number one in Belgium (Flanders and Wallonia) and Germany, and earned certifications in Belgium, France, Germany and Switzerland. Li's third studio album I Never Learn (2014) showcased a more melancholic sound compared to her previous releases, and was named one of the best albums of 2014 by several American music publications.

Studio albums

Extended plays

Singles

As lead artist

As featured artist

Other charted songs

Guest appearances

Songwriting credits

Music videos

Notes

References

External links
 
 [ Lykke Li] discography at AllMusic
 
 

Discographies of Swedish artists
Pop music discographies